Capitanio is an Italian surname. Notable people with the surname include:

Aldo Capitanio (1952–2001), Italian comic book artist
Bartolomea Capitanio (1807–1833), Italian saint
Filippo Capitanio (born 1993), Italian footballer
Giulio Capitanio (born 1952), Italian cross-country skier

Italian-language surnames